"Una Fan Enamorada" ("Fan in Love") is a song by Venezuelan duo Servando & Florentino from their debut album Los Primera (1997). It was written by Venezuelan musician Ricardo Montaner and released as the album's lead single in 1997. The song was recorded in salsa and ballad. It speaks of a "direct intimacy and understanding to every smitten fan who pined for the guys". Diana Raquel of La Prensa praised as a "catchy song where the voices of Servando and Florentino are heard in perfect harmony."  The Miami Herald critic Eliseo Cardona was less impressed with the track, stating it should only be listed to once as it has "the same plot of a Venevision soap opera". "Una Fan Enamorada" served as the closing theme for the Venezuelan telenovela Todo por tu amor (1997).  "Una Fan Enamorada"  was nominated in the category of Tropical Song of the Year at the 11th Annual Lo Nuestro Awards, but lost to "Suavemente" by Elvis Crespo.

Charts

Weekly charts

Year-end charts

See also
 List of number-one Billboard Hot Latin Tracks of 1998
List of Billboard Tropical Airplay number ones of 1998

References

1997 songs
1997 debut singles
Servando & Florentino songs
Spanish-language songs
Telenovela theme songs
Song recordings produced by Sergio George